Old North Manchester Public Library is a historic Carnegie library building located at North Manchester, Wabash County, Indiana.  It was built in 1912, and is a two-story, rectangular, American Craftsman style dark red brick building over a basement. It has a low-pitched side gable roof of red Spanish tile and wide overhanging eaves.  The building corners feature massive piers with sloping sides.  It was built in part with a $10,000 donation from the Carnegie Foundation.

It was listed on the National Register of Historic Places in 1996. The building no longer contains a public library; since the 1990s, it is owned by a private law firm. The "new" North Manchester Public Library is located at 405 North Market Street.

References

External links
 

Carnegie libraries in Indiana
Historic American Buildings Survey in Indiana
Libraries on the National Register of Historic Places in Indiana
Bungalow architecture in Indiana
Library buildings completed in 1912
Buildings and structures in Wabash County, Indiana
National Register of Historic Places in Wabash County, Indiana
1912 establishments in Indiana